Will Espero (born November 6, 1960) is an American politician who served as a state senator for the 19th district of the State of Hawaiʻi from 2002 until 2018.  He is a member of the Democratic Party.

Early life and education 
Born on November 6, 1960, at a United States naval base in Yokosuka, Japan, Espero is the son of Victor and Paulina Espero.  Originally from Bacnotan, La Union, Philippines, Victor served in the United States Navy for 21 years while his wife, Paulina, originally from Santiago, Ilocos Sur, Philippines, retired as a licensed practical nurse.  As entrepreneurs, Victor and Paulina also operated a restaurant, catering service, and carehomes.

Growing up in a military family, Espero lived in Vallejo, California, Jacksonville, Florida, Athens, Georgia, Norfolk, Virginia, Oak Harbor, Washington, Guantanamo Bay, Cuba, Naples, Italy, and Yokosuka, Japan.

Espero attended Seattle University where he received his Bachelor of Science in Business Management in 1982.  Later that year, he moved to Hawaiʻi and established a home.  He worked in the finance and banking industry, property management, local home development, and the Coalition for a Drug Free Hawaiʻi.  A few years later in 1987, he entered politics, working with former mayor Frank Fasi and his administration as the executive secretary of the City and County of Honolulu Neighborhood Commission.

Political career 
From 1987 to 1994, Will Espero was an appointee of Mayor Frank Fasi. He was the executive secretary of the Neighborhood  Commission in charge of Oahu's Neighborhood Boards.

In December 1999, Espero was appointed to the Hawaiʻi State House of Representatives by Governor Ben Cayetano to fill the vacancy left by the resignation of then-representative Paul Oshiro.  In 2002, he ran a successful campaign and was elected into the Hawaiʻi State Senate.
He represented District 20, which stretched from lower Waipahu to ʻEwa Beach, where Espero resides. After the reapportionment of Hawaiʻi's districts, Espero became the senator for District 19 which now includes 'Ewa Beach, Ocean Pointe, 'Ewa by Gentry, Iroquois Point, and a portion of 'Ewa Villages.

Espero had formerly served as the Vice President of the Hawaiʻi Senate. He had also served as the Majority Floor Leader and Chairman of the Committee on Public Safety, Intergovernmental and Military Affairs (PGM).  He was a member of both the Committees on Transportation and International Affairs (TIA) and Ways and Means (WAM).

Leadership positions 
 State Senator, 2000–2018
 Chair, Senate Housing Committee, 2016-2018
 Vice President, 2015–2016
 Majority Floor Leader, 2010–2015; 2017-2018
 Chair, Public Safety, Intergovernmental, and Military Affairs, 2010–2015
 Co-chair, Transportation and International Affairs

Legislation introduced 

 Act 094, SLH 2002 (main sponsor) - Hawaiʻi's version of Kelsey's Law
 Act 101, SLH 2012 (main sponsor) - creates opportunities for space tourism in Hawaiʻi
 Act 235, SLH 2012 (main sponsor) - appropriates funds for an advisory group for Honouliuli Camp Site, a World War 2 internment camp on Oahu, Hawaiʻi
 Act 070, SLH 2011 (main sponsor) - designates Gold Star Family plates to the family members of fallen soldiers
 Act 125, SLH 2011 (main sponsor) - requires persons convicted of violation of privacy in 1st degree & all persons convicted of promoting prostitution in 1st degree to register as sex offenders
 Act 027, SLH 2010 (main sponsor) - requires Office of Veterans Services to ensure the burial & inurnment of veteran's remains who is without immediate surviving family members
 Act 165, SLH 2010 (co-sponsor) - establishes the crime of intentionally or knowingly taking of a Hawaiian monk seal as a Class C felony
 Act 160, SLH 2009 (co-sponsor) - clarifies animal cruelty law by prohibiting the confinements & restraining of a pet animal in a cruel or inhumane manner
 Act 133, SLH 2008 (co-sponsor) - creates new misdemeanor offense of harassment by impersonation
 Act 164, SLH 2008 (main sponsor) - allows the Hawaiʻi teacher standards board to suspend a teacher's license when the teacher has been convicted of sexual offenses & to initiate proceedings to permanently revoke their license
 Act 127, SLH 2005 (main sponsor) - designates the path from Halawa landing to Waipahu as the Pearl Harbor Historic Trail

Community involvement 

 'Ewa Beach Boys and Girls Club, Board of Directors
 Friends of the 'Ewa Beach Library, Founder and president
 Friends of the Hawaiʻi State Art Museum, Board of Directors
 Mele Murals and Estria Foundation, Advisor
 Operation Homefront of Hawaiʻi, Board member
 Re-entry Collaborative Population Management, Board member
 State Council for Interstate Adult Offender Supervision, Board member
 West Oahu Economic Development Association, Founder and board member
 Workforce Development Council, Board member
 Clean and Sober Homes and Halfway House Task Force, Member
 Government Contracting Task Force, Member
 'Ewa Beach Lions Club, Member
 'Ewa Beach Community Trust Fund, Member
 Steering Committee of the Hawaiʻi Justice Reinvestment Initiative, Member
 Oahu Metropolitan Planning Organization Policy Committee, Member
 Correction Population Management Commission
 'Ewa Beach Community Association
 'Ewa by Gentry Community Association
 'Ewa Neighborhood Board
 Hawaiʻi Fashion Month
 Hawaiʻi Impaired Driving Task Force
 Interstate Commission for Adult Offender Supervision
 Oahu Filipino Jaycees
 Oahu Going Home - Reintegration of Ex-Offenders
 Our Lady of Perpetual Help Knights of Columbus

Awards 

 Civil Air Patrol, Certificate of Appreciation
 'Ewa Beach Lions Club, Distinguished Service Award
 Kanu O Ka'aina, Certificate of Appreciation
 Oahu Metropolitan Planning Organization, Certificate of Appreciation
 'Olelo Community Media, Certificate of Appreciation
 USS Ronald Reagan, Honorary Naval Aviator on Board

2014 U.S. House of Representatives election 

On Sunday, July 21, 2013, Espero announced his candidacy campaign for the 1st Congressional District of Hawaiʻi, the seat Hawaiʻi U.S. Representative Colleen Hanabusa vacated to run against Hawaiʻi U.S. Senator Brian Schatz. In the Democratic primary, Espero lost the party nomination to Mark Takai.

2018 lieutenant gubernatorial election 

In September 2017, Espero tweeted that he would run for Lieutenant Governor of Hawaii. He lost the Democratic primary to his colleague Sen. Josh Green.

References

External links 
 Win With Will
 Hawaiʻi State Legislature
 Hawaiʻi Senator Will Espero

Willespero.com

1960 births
Democratic Party Hawaii state senators
Hawaii politicians of Filipino descent
Living people
Democratic Party members of the Hawaii House of Representatives
American politicians of Filipino descent
Asian-American people in Hawaii politics
21st-century American politicians